Bill Cosby Talks to Kids About Drugs (1971) is an album by Bill Cosby. Unlike most of his recordings, this is not a full-fledged comedy album, but rather a record intended for children to school them on the dangers of drugs through songs and dialogue. It won the Grammy Award in 1972 for Best Recording for Children.

Track listing
Introduction - Downers And Uppers
Questions and Answers
Dope Pusher
Bill Talks About Hard Drugs
I Found a Way Out
Order In The Classroom
People Make Mistakes
I Know I Can Handle It
Bill Talks About Pushers
Captain Junkie
Bill and the Kids Sing / Closing

References

1971 albums
Bill Cosby albums
Spoken word albums by American artists
Children's albums
History of drug control in the United States
Uni Records albums